Chiaverano is a comune (municipality) in the Metropolitan City of Turin in the Italian region Piedmont, located about  northeast of Turin.

Chiaverano borders the following municipalities: Donato, Andrate, Borgofranco d'Ivrea, Sala Biellese, Torrazzo, Montalto Dora, Burolo, Ivrea, and Cascinette d'Ivrea. Sights include the Romanesque church of Santo Stefano di Sessano (11th century) and the remains of the Castle of San Giuseppe.

Part of Lake Sirio lies within the boundaries of the comune.

Twin towns 

  Mane, France

References

External links 

 Official website
 Chiaverano tourism

Cities and towns in Piedmont